Rice is an unincorporated community in Wasco County, in the U.S. state of Oregon.

Rice was named for Horace Rice, who settled on upper Fifteenmile Creek in the 1860s and who planted the first crop of wheat in upland Wasco County. When the Great Southern Railroad established a line into the area in 1905, Rice's name was given to the station.

References

Populated places established in 1905
Unincorporated communities in Wasco County, Oregon
1905 establishments in Oregon
Unincorporated communities in Oregon